The Cigarette Countess is a 1922 German silent drama film directed by Wolfgang Neff and starring Esther Carena, Carl Auen and Olga Limburg.

The film's sets were designed by the art director Franz Schroedter.

Cast
 Esther Carena
 Carl Auen
 Olga Limburg
 Hermann Picha
 Lo Bergner
 Rolf Prasch
 Alfred Schmasow

References

External links

1922 films
Films of the Weimar Republic
German silent feature films
Films directed by Wolfgang Neff
German black-and-white films
1922 drama films
German drama films
Silent drama films
1920s German films
1920s German-language films